Labaki (in Arabic لبكي) is an Arabic surname. Notable persons with that surname include:

Carmen Labaki (born 1971), Lebanese–Brazilian film and television director and producer
Nadine Labaki (born 1974), Lebanese film director and actress
Salah Labaki (1906–1955), Lebanese poet
Yolande Labaki (born 1927), Lebanese artist

See also

Surnames of Lebanese origin